American R&B singer Trey Songz has released nine studio albums, two extended plays (EPs), seven mixtapes and fifty-nine singles (including thirty as a featured artist). His music has sold an overall 25 million records worldwide in singles and albums.

Albums

Studio albums

Reissued albums

EPs

Mixtapes

Singles

As lead artist

As featured artist

Billboard Year-End performances

Promotional singles

Other charted and certified songs

Guest appearances

Notes 

 a.  "Da Baddest" charted at number one on the Bubbling Under R&B/Hip-Hop Singles chart.

References

External links
 
 
 Trey Songz at Discogs

Discographies of American artists
Rhythm and blues discographies